Kočani is a town in the eastern part of North Macedonia, situated around  east from Skopje. It has a population of 28,330 and is the seat of the Kočani Municipality.

Geography and population
The town spreads across the Northern side of the Kočani valley, along the banks of the Kočani river, where it leaves the mountain slopes and flows through the valley.

 1948 - 6,657 inhabitants
 1994 - 26,364 inhabitants
 2002 - 28,330 inhabitants

Demographics

Ethnic structure

According to the 1903 Austrian consular reports on ethnic composition of the kazas of the Sanjak of Skopje in 1903, the kaza of Kočani was populated by a total of 39,406 inhabitants, of whom 16,524 (41.93%) were Bulgarian Exarchists, 11,600 (29.44%) Ottoman Muslim, 7,800 (19.79%) Albanians, 1,680 (4.26%)  Aromanians, 1,090 (2.77%) Patriarchists and 712 (1.8%) Romanis.

According to the 2002 census, the ethnic composition of the city is as follows:
Macedonian: 90.3%
Roma: 5.0%
Turks: 3.0%
Vlachs: 0.5%
Serbs: 0.2%
Other: 1.0%

Religious denomination
Orthodox: 96% 
Muslims: 3% 
Catholic: 0.3%
Other: 0.7%

Climate
The climate is humid subtropical (Köppen: Cfa), influenced by altered Mediterranean climate which penetrates along the river Bregalnica.

History

Due to its favourable geographic location, together with excellent natural climate characteristics, Kočani was inhabited as early as the ancient times first by the Paionians, Meds and Thracians.
Later on, in the 6th century the Slavs inhabited parts of the region. More precisely, in the 7th century members of the Slavic tribe Smolyani colonized the Kočani valley and built a fortification. The founders of the Slavic education, brothers Kiril and Metodij (Cyril and Methodius), stayed in the valley from the year 845 to 855 and in the Bregalnica area (Morodvis) started to preach Christianity in Slavic language.

Although the settlement existed long before that, Kočani was first mentioned in a charter from 1337 in which Despot Jovan Oliver donated the church of St. Dimitrija to Kočani.

Archaeological finds in the town itself have revealed remains of a settlement here in the Roman and Byzantine periods. Early in the 15th century it fell under Turkish rule. The travel chronicler Evliya Çelebi, who visited it in 1662, recorded that it had 600 households, a mosque, a mezjid, an inn and 15 handicraft stores. During the 18th and in the early 19th century, the town growth rate stagnated. It was only around 1878 that the population began to rise, at which time it had about 450 - 500 households. The town has two feudal residences in the shape of towers believed to date from the 16th - 17th century.

Monuments
Numerous cultural and historical monuments, from ancient times to the Middle Ages, can be found in the vicinity of Kočani. One of them is an archeological site of Dolno Gradishte from the late antic period, and two medieval towers at the city center.

Monastery complexes in the nearby villages Morodvis and Panteley are world-famous both for their architecture and unique frescoes.

Features

The town green, especially along the river bed and banks of the Kočani river, is the pride of the local people. The town is very clean and neat, for which it has proudly held the prestigious title of the cleanest town in North Macedonia.

Today Kočani is a modern town with planned infrastructure, avenues, many modern buildings and blocks of flats, a hospital, a shopping centre, a park and a newly built industrial zone. All this is carefully planned and structured, according to modern standards of living and esthetics. New suburbs are mainly built to the east where the town almost reaches the first houses of Orizari and to the West spreading over the industrial zone.

Education 
The City of Kočani is served by four primary schools:

 Nikola Karev Primary School
 Saints Cyril and Methodius Primary School
 Rade Kratovče Primary School
 Malina Popivanova Primary School

There are also two secondary schools:

Ljupčo Santov Gymnasium (specializing in economics)
 Gjošo Vikentev (specializing in electronics and machining)

There is also a primary school specializing in music:

 Risto Jurukov Primary School for Music

The city also maintains a municipal library "Iskra" ("spark").

Sports
Local football club FK Osogovo has played several seasons in the Macedonian First Football League.

Town partnerships 

Kočani maintains partnership links with the following places:
 Kazanlak, Bulgaria
 Szigetszentmiklós, Hungary
 Yenifoça, Turkey
 Križevci, Croatia
 Pereyaslav, Ukraine
 Kranj, Slovenia
 Novi Kneževac, Serbia
 Gosport, England

Notable people 
 Kočani Orkestar, musicians
 Kiril F. Dzmbov, nuclear physicist, member of the Serbian Academy of Sciences and Arts and of MANU
 Rade Kratovče, revolutionary
 Pavle Krošarev, pilot, (the first Macedonian civil-aviation pilot to achieve the rank of an airline captain)
 Branko Pendovski, writer, president of the Writers' Association of Macedonia
 Malina Popivanova, revolutionary
 Blagoja Popov, politician, Chairman of the Executive Council (Prime Minister) of Macedonia 1974-1982   
 Blagoj S. Popov, mathematician and first Dean of the Faculty of Natural Sciences and Mathematics of the University of Skopje, member of MANU  
 Ljupčo Santov, revolutionary
 Stevo Teodosievski, musician
 Boyka Vaptsarova bg, public figure, wife of Bulgarian poet Nikola Vaptsarov
 Jordan Pop-Jordanov, engineer and physicist, member of the Macedonian Academy of Sciences and Arts
 Dr. Blagica Jovanova, engineer and Ph.D in computer science, scientist, visiting Professor in Universities in Paris and Macedonia, member and contributor of MPEG standards
 Simeon Kango Ivanov, musician
 Gošo Vikentiev, commander in the XIV Macedonian Youth National Liberation Brigade in the attack to liberate Kočani from the Axis powers during World War II

See also
Coat of arms of Kočani Municipality

References

External links 

Local Government Of The City Of Kočani, North Macedonia
Old photographs of Kočani
Blog about Kocani, Rural tourism

 
Towns in North Macedonia